The 2013–14 Yale Bulldogs men's ice hockey season was the 119th season of play for the program and the 53rd season in the ECAC Hockey conference. The Bulldogs represented Yale University and were coached by Keith Allain, in his 8th season.

Season
Yale began the defense of their first NCAA Championship with a top-10 preseason ranking. Their regular season kicked off with the Liberty Invitational Tournament and, though they finished third, the Bulldogs found some success early in the season. Initially, the two freshman goaltenders, Alex Lyon and Patrick Spano, traded starts but by mid-November head coach Keith Allain had settled on Lyon as the team's primary netminder.

Through the first half of the season, Yale remained in the hunt to return to the NCAA Tournament. After defeating arch-rival Harvard at Madison Square Gardens they got up to #8 in the national polls, but the team began slipping afterwards. From the third week of January on, Yale wasn't able to sweep a single weekend for the remainder of the regular season. Worse, the team's performance against ranked teams was less than satisfactory. When the ECAC Tournament began, Yale had gone 1–6–2 against ranked teams, which put them on the bubble for an at-large bid. The Bulldogs needed a strong performance in the conference playoff to have any chance at a postseason bid and began their run with two solid wins in the First Round.

Their quarterfinal match against Quinnipiac would decide whether or not Yale could perform against good teams and if it had more hockey yet to play. The answer to both was 'no'; Yale surrendered 11 goals in 2 games and lost to the #6 team, leaving them with just a single win in 11 games against ranked opponents on the year.

Departures

Recruiting

Roster
As of February 2014.

Coaching staff

Standings

Schedule and results

|-
!colspan=12 style="color:white; background:#00356B" | Exhibition

|-
!colspan=12 style="color:white; background:#00356B" | 

|-
!colspan=12 style="color:white; background:#00356B" | Regular Season

|-
!colspan=12 style="color:white; background:#00356B" | 

|- align="center" bgcolor="#e0e0e0"
|colspan=12|Yale Won Series 2–0

|- align="center" bgcolor="#e0e0e0"
|colspan=12|Yale Lost Series 0–2

Scoring statistics

Goaltending statistics

Rankings

Awards and honors

References

Yale Bulldogs men's ice hockey seasons
Yale Bulldogs
Yale
Yale Bulldogs
Yale Bulldogs